Push processing in photography, sometimes called uprating, refers to a film developing technique that increases the effective sensitivity of the film being processed. Push processing involves developing the film for more time, possibly in combination with a higher temperature, than the manufacturer's recommendations. This technique results in effective overdevelopment of the film, compensating for underexposure in the camera.

Visual characteristics
Push processing allows relatively insensitive films to be used under lighting conditions that would ordinarily be too low for adequate exposure at the required shutter speed and aperture combination. This technique alters the visual characteristics of the film, such as higher contrast, increased grain and lower resolution. Saturated and distorted colours are often visible on colour film that has been push processed. 

Pull processing involves overexposure and underdevelopment, effectively decreasing the sensitivity of the processed film. It is achieved by developing the film for a shorter time, and possibly at a lower temperature. Film that has been pull processed will display the opposite change in visual characteristics. This may be deliberately exploited for artistic effect.

Exposure index

When a film's effective sensitivity has been varied, the resulting sensitivity is called the exposure index; the film's speed remains at the manufacturer's indication. For example, an ISO 200/24° film could be push processed to EI 400/27° or pull processed to EI 100/21°.

In cinema

John Alcott won an Oscar "for his gorgeous use of natural lighting" in Stanley Kubrick's 1975 period film Barry Lyndon, set in the 18th century, where he succeeded in filming scenes lit only by candlelight through the use of special wide-aperture Carl Zeiss Planar 50mm f/0.7 lenses designed for NASA for low-light shooting on moon landings, and push-processing the film stock.

Paul Thomas Anderson and Michael Bauman used this technique on their 35mm film stock for the 2017 film Phantom Thread, also filling its frames with "theatrical haze" to "dirty up" the look of the film.

See also
 Film speed
 Latent image
 Photographic processing

References

External links

 Push/Pull Processing at Kodak

Photographic techniques